Gilles Valiquette (born April 7, 1952 in Montreal, Quebec) is a Canadian rock musician, stage actor and record producer.

Career
After studying music at Lionel-Groulx College and Cégep Saint-Laurent in Montreal, Valiquette first emerged with the rock group Someone, with whom he recorded two singles. He subsequently became a supporting musician for Les Séguin and Jacques Michel, before releasing his first solo album, Chansons pour un café, in 1972.

In 1980, he played the role of Roger Roger in the musical Starmania at Montreal's Comédie nationale. He subsequently launched his own recording studio, and has produced albums for Jim Corcoran, Bertrand Gosselin, Plume Latraverse, Daniel Lavoie, Robert Paquette, Gilles Rivard and Richard Séguin. He largely stopped recording new material after this time.

His 1973 hit "Je suis cool" was covered by Big Sugar on their 1999 EP Chauffe à bloc.

Discography

Studio albums
 Chansons pour un café (1972)
 Deuxième Arrêt (1973)
 Du même nom (1975)
 Soirées d'automne (1975)
 Valiquette est en ville (1976)
 Vol de nuit (1978)
 Valiquette (1980)
 Pièces (1993)
 Secrètement public (2007)

Compilations
 1972-1975 (1976)
 Où est passé le temps? (1992)
 Demandes spéciales (1994)
 Pour l'occasion (2006)
 Les 9 premiers (2008)

References

External links
 Gilles Valiquette

Canadian rock singers
Canadian rock guitarists
Canadian male guitarists
Canadian singer-songwriters
Canadian male singers
Canadian male musical theatre actors
Canadian record producers
Musicians from Montreal
Living people
French Quebecers
1952 births
Canadian male singer-songwriters